The 1983–84 Michigan Wolverines men's basketball team represented the University of Michigan in intercollegiate college basketball during the 1983–84 season. The team played its home games in the Crisler Arena in Ann Arbor, Michigan, and was a member of the Big Ten Conference.  Under the direction of head coach Bill Frieder, the team finished tied for fourth in the Big Ten Conference.  The team earned an invitation to the 1984 National Invitation Tournament (NIT) where it was crowned champion. Although during the seventeen weeks of Associated Press Top Twenty Poll the team was ranked twice, including a peak of number fifteen, it began and finished the season unranked and it also ended the season unranked in the final UPI Coaches' Poll. Dan Pelekoudas earned honorable mention Academic All-American recognition. Tim McCormick and Eric Turner served as team captains, while Roy Tarpley earned team MVP. Turner's career assist total of 421 eclipsed Steve Grote's 358 and would stand until Antoine Joubert tied him as a junior and then totaled 539 in 1987, while his career average of 5.00 per game, which surpassed Ricky Green's 4.05 would stand until Gary Grant's career ended in 1988 with 5.67 per game.  Tarpley 69 blocked shots and 2.09 blocked shot average were school records that he would break himself in subsequent seasons.  Turner ended his career with an average of 35.3 minutes per game, which surpassed Mike McGee's 1981 record and continues to be the school's best. On January 28, 1984, against Illinois Turner played 56 minutes for the highest single game total in school history, surpassing his 55-minute effort the prior year.  The record still stands.

In the 32-team National Invitation Tournament, Michigan advanced to the final four by defeating the  94–70, the  83–70 and the  63–62.  At the final four in Madison Square Garden the team defeated the  65–59 before beating the  83–63. McCormick was awarded the 1984 NIT Most valuable player award.

Schedule
The team had the following schedule:

Statistics
The team posted the following statistics:

National Invitation Tournament
Michigan won the 1984 National Invitation Tournament.
 First Round
 Michigan 94, Wichita State 70, at Ann Arbor, Mich
 Second Round
 Michigan 83, Marquette 70, at Ann Arbor, Mich
 Quarterfinal
 Michigan 63, Xavier 62, at Ann Arbor, Mich
 Semifinal
 Michigan 78, Virginia Tech 75
 Final
 Michigan 83, Notre Dame 63

Awards and honors
During the season team members earned the following honors:
 Tim McCormick
 NIT Most Valuable Player
 Academic All-Big Ten
 All-Big Ten Conference, 3rd team
 Dan Pelekoudas
 Academic All-American, honorable mention
 Academic All-Big Ten
 Eric Turner
 All-Big Ten Conference, 2nd team
 Roy Tarpley
 All-Big Ten Conference, 3rd team

Rankings

Team players drafted into the NBA
Eight players from this team were selected in the NBA Draft.

See also
 NIT all-time team records
 NIT bids by school and conference
 NIT championships and semifinal appearances

References

Michigan
Michigan Wolverines men's basketball seasons
National Invitation Tournament championship seasons
Michigan
Michigan Wolve
Michigan Wolve